Howmeh Rural District is a rural district (dehestan) in the Central District of Mahvelat County, Razavi Khorasan province, Iran. At the 2006 census, its population was 8,696, in 2,171 families.  The rural district has 6 villages. The capital of the rural district is the village of Abdolabad.

References 

Rural Districts of Razavi Khorasan Province
Mahvelat County